The Zobel Junior Archers (officially the De La Salle Zobel Junior Archers) is the varsity team of De La Salle Santiago Zobel School and is the Juniors' team of De La Salle University's De La Salle Green Archers in the University Athletic Association of the Philippines.  Its girls' team, the Lady Junior Archers, is De La Salle–College of Saint Benilde's Junior's team to the Women's National Collegiate Athletic Association.

History 
De La Salle Santiago Zobel's varsity team was first officially known as the "Golden Bengals," with its mascot being the Fighting Bengal.  This identity was designed and proposed by Brother Raymond Bronowicz FSC, who was the first Brother-Director of the school at that time.  He decided that the school should adopt its own unique identity per the practice of the different De La Salle schools at that time: La Salle Green Hills were the Rangers and De La Salle Lipa were the Dragons then the Stallions.  The adoption of a new mascot was not welcomed by the studentry since a majority came from the grade school in the main campus in Manila and they were used to having an Archer moniker as the former, now defunct, De La Salle College High Schools De La Salle Greenies was.

In 1997, the Board of Trustees of the school, led by its then President-Mr. Lamberto de Ocampo, elected to officially call De La Salle Zobel's varsity team as the Junior Archers.

 History with the UAAP 
The Junior Archers, together with the De La Salle Green Archers,  joined the University Athletic Association of the Philippines in 1986, when De La Salle University picked De La Salle Santiago Zobel School to be its representative in the Junior (High School) division.  De La Salle Zobel was chosen, in spite of La Salle Green Hills being DLSU's junior representative in the NCAA from 1968 to 1981, because the school was at that time was considered a satellite campus of DLSU while LSGH was a completely independent corporate entity.

From the time that the Junior Archers joined the UAAP in 1986 until it won its very first basketball championship in Season 68 (2005–06), the Junior Archers' achievements were considered to be moderate at best.  The team never finished last.

During UAAP Season 68 (2005–06), the Junior Archers won its first UAAP Juniors basketball title when it swept the UPIS Junior Maroons, 2-0.  It was also De La Salle's first Juniors title in either the NCAA or the UAAP since 1955, when the De La Salle Greenies of the then existing De La Salle College High School in Taft Avenue, Manila led by De La Salle basketball great—Kurt Bachmann, won 1955 NCAA Junior Basketball championship.

After its year-long suspension in UAAP Season 69 (2006–07) due to the ineligibility scandal that rocked the whole Lasallian community, the Junior Archers, together with their seniors counterparts the De La Salle Green Archers, won the "double championship" in men's basketball the next season. The Junior Archers swept the defending champions Ateneo de Manila Blue Eaglets to claim their second juniors basketball title in three years.

In the Season 71 of the UAAP, the Junior Archers were the favorites to win their third straight UAAP Juniors Basketball Championship. DLSZ finished second in the standings behind the Ateneo de Manila Blue Eaglets and gained a twice-to-beat advantage and to face the FEU-FERN Baby Tamaraws. Unfortunately, the Baby Tamaraws surprised and swept the two-time defending champions eliminating them as they failed to defend their crown.

The Junior Archers would return to the finals in Season 72, finishing atop the team standings with a 12-2 record and then avenged last year's final four loss to the Baby Tamaraws. However, in the finals, they fell in a hard-fought three-game series to the defending champions Ateneo Blue Eaglets.

Despite having a young roster for Season 73, the Junior Archers still overachieved with a 7-7 record, finishing in a tie for fourth. They would defeat the FEU-FERN Baby Tamaraws in the fourth-place playoff to qualify for the step-ladder phase (the Blue Eaglets finished the season undefeated after 14 games). They then upset the NU Bullpups in a low-scoring affair before bowing to the UST Tiger Cubs in the second step-ladder phase.

In the spirit of De La Salle Philippines's "One La Salle"(all 18-La Salle campuses in the Philippines are under De La Salle Philippines. Inc. headed by Brother Armin Luistro FSC who is also concurrently the President of De La Salle University-Manila), the La Salle Greenies are currently CSB's juniors reps in the NCAA while the Zobel Junior Archers are DLSU's juniors reps in the UAAP.

 Basketball 

(2018)
With 4 veterans and 12 rookies, the Junior Archer are young but opt to prove that they have the caliber to be in the Final Four after 2017's team fell short.De La Salle Zobel Junior Archers'

Coaching Staff 
Head coach: Boris Aldeguer
Assistant coaches:
Warren Capitan
Gian Nazario
Jerry Andaleon
Mac Bautista 
Arfenee Laureaga
Anton Arevalo

DLSZ Juniors Football Team Roster (A.Y. 2013-2014)

History with the WNCAA 

The De La Salle Lady Junior Archers have been the WNCAA Junior Division Champions for eight straight years, from 1993 to 2000 and again in 2004. In contrast to their men's junior counterparts, DLSZ represents College of St. Benilde in the WNCAA since the NCAA didn't have women's basketball in their scheme.

Varsity teams 
Teams of the following sports carry the moniker of Junior Archers or Lady Junior Archers:

Badminton
Baseball
Basketball
Chess
Football
Fencing
Futsal
Lawn Tennis
Softball
Table Tennis
Taekwondo
Track and Field
Volleyball
Mixed Martial Arts
Triathlon

References 

University Athletic Association of the Philippines teams